Rumpless is a term used for the mutation which causes the tail of an animal to be absent. Usage and examples can be found in Manx cats, Manx Rumpy, Belgian d'Everberg and Araucana chickens.

See also
 Rump (animal)
Mutation
Animal anatomy